

Duke of Rohan-Rohan

References and notes

House of Rohan
Dukes of Rohan-Rohan
Princes of Soubise